Adolf Meyer (17 June 1881,   14 July 1929, the Island of ) was a German architect. 

A student and employee of both Bruno Paul and Peter Behrens, Meyer became the office boss of the firm of Walter Gropius around 1915 and a full partner afterwards. In 1919, Gropius appointed Meyer as a master at the Bauhaus, where he taught work drawing and construction technique. Meyer is also credited as co-designer of the Gropius entry for the 1922 Chicago Tribune Tower competition.

From 1926, he practiced as an architect in the New Frankfurt project.

Literature 
 Susan R. Henderson. "Building Culture: Ernst May and the New Frankfurt Initiative, 19261931." Peter Lang, 2013.

References

External links 
 Biography and photo at Bauhaus (in German)

1881 births
1929 deaths
20th-century German architects
Modernist architects
Academic staff of the Bauhaus
People from Euskirchen (district)